Michael Dwain Gallo (born April 2, 1977) is an American former Major League Baseball pitcher.

Biography
He debuted for the Houston Astros on July 2, . Careerwise with the Astros, he was 4-3 with an ERA of 4.11. He attended Long Beach State.

In , he was 0-1 with an ERA of 2.66 in 36 appearances. In the 2005 postseason, he pitched 5.1 innings and only gave up one run on 4 hits. He started  with the Houston Astros, but was sent down to their Triple-A affiliate, the Round Rock Express, on June 2, 2006, after compiling a 1-2 record and a 6.06 ERA in 16.1 innings pitched.

In 2006, he was on the Italian baseball team in the World Baseball Classic. On December 18, 2006, he signed a minor league deal with the Colorado Rockies. In , he spent the entire season in Triple-A with the Colorado Springs Sky Sox. In 56 relief appearances, he went 2-6 with a 5.10 ERA. During the 2007-08 off-season, Gallo signed a minor league contract with the Toronto Blue Jays, but was released on June 5.

References

External links
, or Retrosheet, or Baseball Reference (Minor, Fall and Winter Leagues)

Living people
1977 births
2006 World Baseball Classic players
American people of Italian descent
Auburn Doubledays players
Baseball players from Long Beach, California
Cardenales de Lara players
American expatriate baseball players in Venezuela
Colorado Springs Sky Sox players
Houston Astros players
Lexington Legends players
Long Beach State Dirtbags baseball players
Major League Baseball pitchers
Michigan Battle Cats players
New Hampshire Fisher Cats players
New Orleans Zephyrs players
Round Rock Express players
Scottsdale Scorpions players
Syracuse Chiefs players
Millikan High School alumni